Captain Thomas James Young, VC (1827 – 20 March 1869) was a Royal Navy officer and a recipient of the Victoria Cross, the highest award for gallantry in the face of the enemy that can be awarded to British and Commonwealth forces.

Details
He was approximately 30 years old, and a lieutenant in the Royal Navy, serving with a Naval Brigade from  during the Indian Mutiny when the following deed took place for which he was awarded the VC.

On 16 November 1857 at Lucknow, British India, naval guns were brought up close to the Shah Nujeff mosque, and the gun crews kept up a steady fire in an attempt to breach the walls, while a hail of musket balls and grenades from the mutineers inside the mosque caused heavy casualties. Lieutenant Young moved from gun to gun giving encouragement, and when he and Able Seaman William Hall were the only survivors, all the rest being killed or wounded, Lieutenant Young took the last gunner's place and between them they loaded and fired the gun. The joint citation reads:

He later achieved the rank of captain. He married Louisa Mary Boyes, the sister of Duncan Gordon Boyes, who also won the Victoria Cross.

Young died in Caen, France, and is buried in the Protestant Cemetery there. 

His Victoria Cross is displayed at the National Maritime Museum in Greenwich, London.

References

1827 births
1869 deaths
Royal Navy officers
British recipients of the Victoria Cross
Indian Rebellion of 1857 recipients of the Victoria Cross
Royal Navy recipients of the Victoria Cross
People from Chelsea, London
Royal Navy personnel of the Crimean War
Recipients of the Order of the Medjidie
Military personnel from London
Burials in France